Fanninia is a species of plants in the family Apocynaceae first described as a genus in 1868. It contains only one known species, Fanninia caloglossa, native to South Africa

References

Asclepiadoideae
Flora of South Africa
Monotypic Apocynaceae genera